Werner Seibold (24 January 1948 – 29 November 2012) was a German rifle shooter. He competed at the 1976 and 1984 Olympics and won a bronze medal in 1976, placing 25th in 1984. Seibold won one gold and four silver team medals at the 1978 World Championships.

References

1948 births
2012 deaths
People from Miesbach (district)
Sportspeople from Upper Bavaria
German male sport shooters
ISSF rifle shooters
Olympic shooters of West Germany
Shooters at the 1976 Summer Olympics
Shooters at the 1984 Summer Olympics
Olympic bronze medalists for West Germany
Olympic medalists in shooting
Medalists at the 1976 Summer Olympics